Beatriz Ramírez de la Fuente (6 February 1929, in Mexico City – 20 June 2005, in Mexico City) was a Mexican art historian, notable for her work on pre-Hispanic art in America. In 1998, she was elected a member of the Academia Mexicana de la Historia.

Biography
Beatriz Ramírez was born in Mexico City. She studied literature in National Autonomous University of Mexico (UNAM), graduating in 1953. She subsequently obtained the master's degree in art history from the Universidad Iberoamericana in 1957, and a doctorate in art history from UNAM in 1967. She was teaching at the Faculty of Philosophy and Literature at UNAM, at Universidad Iberoamericana, as well as at the Escuela Nacional de Antropología. Between 1963 and 1970, she was the director of the School of Art History at the Universidad Iberoamericana, and between 1980 and 1986 the director of the Institute of Aesthetics Studies of UNAM. She authored 12 books and over 90 articles in research journals.

An archaeological museum at Teotihuacan is named after Beatriz de la Fuente.

She was married to psychiatrist Ramón de la Fuente Muñiz.

References

People from Mexico City
Mexican art historians
1929 births
2005 deaths